Luis Salinas (born 24 June 1957) is an Argentine jazz guitarist who plays electric and nylon string guitars. His music includes elements of bossa nova, samba, Afro-Uruguayan candombe, salsa, boleros, and jazz. He blends traditional South American musical forms with improvisational modern jazz.

Early life
Luis Salinas was born in Monte Grande and was raised in Villa Diamante, where he lived until the age of 10. After a flood in 1968, he moved back to Monte Grande. His father and stepfather were musicians. He first learned from his father, a "one-man band" who played the high-hat with one foot, the kick drum with the other foot, the guitar, and the harmonica. He used to perform in the Argentine province of Chaco.

Salinas's first time playing the guitar was at the age of five with his stepfather, accompanying him on a chamamé. After hearing him and his father playing music, or after being in a musical environment, he used to stay in his room and practice what he had heard. He owned his first guitar when he was twenty-seven years old. He borrowed guitars from friends in the neighborhood until they realized he kept them too long, and then they refused to lend them to him.

He is self-taught. His best teachers were the records he played by his favorite musicians, which included Joe Pass, Wes Montgomery, Oscar Alemán, and Baden Powell. He learned from a Brazilian guitarist
at the pub El Papagayo, where he started his career and eventually playing at the pub for eight years.

Career 
From 1985 to 1991, he worked with Egle Martin, an Argentinean singer, dancer, and producer and played on her bossa-nova album El Arte Del Encuentro. In 1993, Swedish pianist Anders Persson invited Salinas to play at the Umeå Jazz Festival, followed by a tour of Sweden. He signed with GRP Records in 1995 and recorded his debut album, Salinas, for that label in March 1996 with musicians from George Benson's group. He played at the 30th edition of the Montreux Jazz Festival.

On August 22, 1997, he played to 30,000 concert-goers at the Palabra de Guitarra Latina show in Palma, Mallorca, Spain. One week later, at the Guitarras del Mundo festival in Buenos Aires (August 26–31), he was one of main attractions, playing three concerts at Buenos Aires's La Trastienda Club.

His second album, Solo Guitarra, included a version of "You Are the Sunshine of My Life" by Stevie Wonder.

Collaborations
Salinas has also worked with Adolfo Abalos, Biréli Lagrène, Danilo Pérez, Dave Holland, George Benson, Hermeto Pascoal, María Graña, Mercedes Sosa, Paco de Lucía, Sylvain Luc, and Tomatito.

Universal Music Group asked him to play with B.B. King in Rio de Janeiro. Salinas replied that he would do it if it was acceptable to King. He got a response from Universal that said King was fascinated by his music, which Salinas found hard to believe. He met King at the soundcheck and King said, "You can play the last song, and if people like it we can keep playing some more". They ended up playing four more songs.

Critical reception
Judith Schlesinger writing in AllMusic describes the song "Blue Zamba" on his debut album as "a lovely solo track that belongs squarely in the tradition of the great Latin acoustic players, but with a whiff of Joe Pass as well. All told, a very promising debut."

Discography
 1995 Aire de Tango (Dragon)
 1997 Salinas (GRP)
 2003 Música Argentina, Vol. 1
 2003 Música Argentina, Vol. 2
 2003 Rosario (GRP)
 2003 Sólo Guitarra
 2004 Ahí Va
 2005 Salinas y Amigos en España (Sony BMG)
 2006 En Vivo en el Rosedal (Dreyfus)
 2006 Música Argentina
 2007 Folklore, Vol. 1
 2007 Folklore, Vol. 2
 2007 Muchas Cosas (Sony BMG)
 2007 Sólo Guitarras (Frank Andrada)
 2008 Sólo Guitarra
 2008 Tango
 2009 Día 2 Tango 8
 2009 Día 2: Luis Salinas En Vivo
 2009 En Vivo: Día, Vol. 1
 2016 El Tren: Sólo Guitarra

Awards
Gardel Awards
 2003 – Best folk album, Música Argentina Vol 1 y 2
 2004 – Best Jazz album, Ahí va
 2006 – Best Jazz album, Salinas y amigos en España
 2007 – Best Instrumental album, Muchas Cosas
 2008 – Best Conceptual album, Clásicos de música Argentina y algo más...

Latin Grammy nominations
 2006 – Latin Grammy nomination for Best Instrumental album, Salinas y amigos en España
 2008 – Latin Grammy nomination for Best Instrumental album, Tango

References

External links

Living people
1957 births
GRP Records artists
Verve Records artists
Argentine jazz guitarists